Ferricoronadite is a lead mineral discovered in 2016 by Chukanov et al. near Nezhilovo, North Macedonia. Its  simplified elemental formula is Pb(Mn64+Fe23+)O16, and it is found in a matrix of zinc-dominant spinels. Ferricoronadite is named as an analogue of coronadite.

References

Lead minerals
Iron minerals
Manganese minerals
Geology of North Macedonia
Minerals described in 2016